Homana, also known as Homona and Homonanda, was a town of ancient Pisidia and later of Isauria and Lycaonia, inhabited in Hellenistic and Roman times. Pliny the Elder puts the town in Pisidia. It appears in the Synecdemus as part of Lycaonia under the name Umanada or Oumanada. It was the capital of the Homanadeis (Ὁμαναδεῖς), who, besides Homana, are said by Tacitus to have possessed 44 forts, a statement opposed to the remarks of Strabo, according to which the Homanades, the most barbarous of all Pisidian tribes, dwelt on the northern slope of the highest mountains without any towns or villages, living only in caves. In the reign of Augustus, the consul Quirinius compelled this little tribe, by famine, to surrender, and distributed 4000 of them as colonists among the neighbouring towns. It became a bishopric; no longer the seat of a residential bishop, it remains, under the name of Homona, a titular see of the Catholic Church.

Its site is located southwest of Lake Trogitis, Seydişehir, Konya Province, Turkey.

References

Relevant literature
Ramsay, W. M. "Studies in the Roman Province Galatia: I. The Homanadeis and the Homanadensian War." The Journal of Roman Studies 7 (1917): 229-283.

Populated places in Pisidia
Populated places in ancient Isauria
Populated places in ancient Lycaonia
Catholic titular sees in Asia
Former populated places in Turkey
Roman towns and cities in Turkey
History of Konya Province